The Rwenzori turaco (Gallirex johnstoni) is a bird in the family Musophagidae. It is native to the Albertine Rift montane forests.

The Rwenzori turaco is a herbivorous bird: about 92% of its diet consists of fruit and 6.3% of leaves.

References

Rwenzori turaco
Rwenzori turaco
Taxonomy articles created by Polbot